Oleg Svyatoslavich may refer to:

 Oleg of Drelinia, a son of Svyatoslav I of Kiev, appointed to rule over the Derevlians (10th century)
 Prince Oleg I of Chernigov (r. 1097–1115)
 Oleg I Svyatoslavich, Prince of Putivl until 1164, see Oleg I of Chernigov
 Oleg II Svyatoslavich (c 1137 - 1180) Prince of Novgorod-Seversk
 Prince Oleg III Svyatoslavich (Prince of Chernigov) (c. 1147 – 1204)